White Branch is an unincorporated community and census-designated place (CDP) in Benton County, Missouri, United States. It is southwest of the center of the county, on the south side of the Osage River where it is joined from the south by White Branch, a tributary. To the north, across the Osage, is the city of Warsaw, the Benton county seat. U.S. Route 65 forms the western edge of the CDP, leading north through Warsaw  to Sedalia and south  to Springfield.

White Branch was first listed as a CDP prior to the 2020 census.

Demographics

References 

Census-designated places in Benton County, Missouri
Census-designated places in Missouri